The Associated Press College Football Player of the Year award has been awarded annually since 1998 to the most outstanding collegiate football player in the country. The winner is chosen by a vote of AP sportswriters and sports editors from throughout the country.

Winners

Winners by school

References

College football national player awards
Awards established in 1998
Associated Press awards